Holborn and St Pancras South was a parliamentary constituency centred on the Holborn district of Central London.  It returned one Member of Parliament (MP) to the House of Commons of the Parliament of the United Kingdom, elected by the first-past-the-post voting system.

The constituency was created for the 1950 general election, and abolished for the 1983 general election, when it was largely replaced by the new constituency of Holborn and St Pancras.

Boundaries

1950–1974: The Metropolitan Borough of Holborn, and wards five, six, seven and eight of the Metropolitan Borough of St Pancras.

1974–1983: The London Borough of Camden wards of Bloomsbury, Euston, Holborn, King's Cross, Regent's Park, and St Pancras.

Members of Parliament

Election results

Elections in the 1950s

Elections in the 1960s

Elections in the 1970s

References

Parliamentary constituencies in London (historic)
Constituencies of the Parliament of the United Kingdom established in 1950
Constituencies of the Parliament of the United Kingdom disestablished in 1983
Politics of the London Borough of Camden